Michelle Tyler (born 8 July 1958) is a British former professional tennis player who won the singles title at the French Open Girls' event in 1976.

She reached the quarterfinal of the doubles event at the 1976 Australian Open, partnering Sue Barker, in which they lost in three sets to Kathleen Harter and Wendy Turnbull.

Tyler was the runner-up at the 1977 Kent Championships singles event after losing the final in three sets to Yvonne Vermaak.

In 1977 and 1978 she was a member of the British team in the Wightman Cup, the annual women's team tennis competition between the United States and Great Britain. In 1977 she lost her singles rubber to Rosemary Casals while the following year she won her singles rubber against Pam Shriver.

WTA career finals

Singles (1 runner-up)

Doubles (1 titles, 2 runner-ups)

Retirement
Tyler retired in 1979, and worked at a department store in Bromley, as well as working as a tennis coach. She subsequently emigrated to the United States.

References

External links
 
 
 

1958 births
British female tennis players
Living people
French Open junior champions
Place of birth missing (living people)
Grand Slam (tennis) champions in girls' singles